Wet Leg are a British indie rock group from the Isle of Wight, founded in 2019 by Rhian Teasdale and Hester Chambers. They debuted with the single "Chaise Longue" in 2021. Their self-titled debut album debuted in 2022 at number one on the UK Albums Chart, Australia's  ARIA Albums Chart and the Irish Albums Chart. The album was shortlisted for the 2022 Mercury Prize. At the 65th Annual Grammy Awards, Wet Leg won Best Alternative Music Album for their debut and Best Alternative Music Performance for "Chaise Longue", and were nominated for Best New Artist. They also won Best New Artist and Best British Group at the 2023 Brit Awards.

History

Early lives
Merseyside-born Teasdale moved from Formby to the Isle of Wight when she was eight. She performed for many years on the Isle of Wight as a local musician and pianist, and prior to forming Wet Leg, was known as RHAIN and was linked to the music scene in Bristol. As RHAIN, Teasdale performed her song "Humdrum Drivel" in 2013. In 2014 she was photographed by Cosmopolitan magazine while attending the Isle of Wight music festival.

2021–present: Band beginnings and first studio album
Teasdale and Chambers first met at Platform One College of Music on the Isle of Wight while studying. After ten years of friendship, they formed a band in 2019 under the name Wet Leg, signed with Domino Recording Company. According to a December 2021 interview, they chose the name by playing a game—picking different emoji combinations; on getting to Wet Leg, it stuck. In an interview with Diffus posted on YouTube in April 2022, the band humorously stated that their name came from an Isle of Wight epithet to describe non-locals on the island. Those who had crossed the Solent to reach the isle were said to have a wet leg from getting off the boat.

Their debut single, "Chaise Longue", was released on 15 June 2021, and gained media notice for earning millions of streams and video views. Their second single, "Wet Dream", was released on 28 September 2021. Variety noted, "It's rare that a new group releases two songs and they're both great". They appeared on Later... with Jools Holland on BBC2, on 30 October 2021. On 29 November 2021, they announced their debut self-titled album, released on 8 April 2022 via Domino. The same day, Wet Leg released the double-single "Too Late Now" / "Oh No".

In 2022, they toured the UK playing songs from their first album. It was announced that they would tour Australia and New Zealand as the support band for a tour by Harry Styles in 2023. Wet Leg appeared on Later... with Jools Holland in November 2021 and returned for the first part of his next series in May 2022.

In an interview with Andrew Ford of ABC in Australia in July 2022, Wet Leg clarified that a comment about a completed second album in a previous interview was "a big joke". "We haven't got a second album; we haven't had any time to write".

Wet Leg received three nominations at the 65th Annual Grammy Awards, including Best New Artist, Best Alternative Music Performance ("Chaise Longue") and Best Alternative Music Album. On 5 February 2023, at the Crypto.com Arena in Los Angeles, Wet Leg won two Grammys, for Best Alternative Music Performance and Best Alternative Music Album. Wet Leg won Best New Artist and Group of the Year at the Brit Awards 2023 where they performed "Chaise Longue" with the prog Morris dance troup, Boss Morris, and their Morris beasts.

Members 

 Rhian Teasdale – lead vocals, rhythm guitar 
 Hester Chambers – lead guitar, backing vocals 

Touring members
 Henry Holmes – drums, percussion 
 Ellis Durand – bass, backing vocals 
 Josh Mobaraki – additional guitars, synthesizer, backing vocals

Discography

Studio albums

Extended plays

Singles

Music videos

Accolades

References

External links 
 
 
 RHAIN Bandcamp

2019 establishments in England
Brit Award winners
Britpop groups
Domino Recording Company artists
English indie rock groups
Female musical duos
Grammy Award winners
Musical groups established in 2019
Musical groups from the Isle of Wight
Rock music duos